The 2008 British Indoor Athletics Championships was the 2nd edition of the national championship in indoor track and field for the United Kingdom. It was held from 9–10 February at the English Institute of Sport, Sheffield, England. A total of 24 events (divided evenly between the sexes) were contested over the two-day competition.

Medal summary

Men

Women

References 

2008 British Indoor Championships. UKAthletics. Retrieved 2020-01-24.
Norwich Union Trials & UK Championships. Power of 10. Retrieved 2020-01-24.

British Indoor Championships
British Indoor Athletics Championships
Sports competitions in Sheffield
Athletics Indoor
Athletics competitions in England
British Indoor Athletics Championships